Azure is a 1928 painting by the Flemish artist Gustave Van de Woestijne, now in the Royal Museum of Fine Arts Antwerp.

References

Paintings in the collection of the Royal Museum of Fine Arts Antwerp
Paintings by Gustave Van de Woestijne
1928 paintings